Have Sunshine in Your Heart is a 1953 West German drama film directed by Erich Waschneck and starring Carl Wery, Liselotte Pulver, and Hans Hessling. It was shot at Göttingen Studios and on location in the Austrian village of St. Gilgen. The film's sets were designed by Gabriel Pellon and Sepp Rothaur.

Cast

References

Bibliography

External links 
 

1953 films
1953 drama films
German drama films
West German films
1950s German-language films
Films directed by Erich Waschneck
German black-and-white films
1950s German films
Films shot at Göttingen Studios